George Hull (January 8, 1788 – January 7, 1868) was an American, merchant, businessman, and politician from Massachusetts.  A prominent shop owner in Sandisfield, Massachusetts, he served as the 15th Lieutenant Governor for the Commonwealth of Massachusetts from 1836 through 1843.

Life
George Hull was born in Farmington, Connecticut, to Eliakim Hull, who moved his family to Sandisfield, Massachusetts, when George was twelve.  The elder Hull opened a shop, in which his son was employed as a clerk.  George Hull was educated in the local district school in Farmington prior to the family's move, but received no further formal education.  He took over management of the store when he turned 21, and became prominent in local civic affairs, serving as the town's postmaster, town clerk, and in other civic posts.  In addition to these activities, he owned farmland near the town center, and also operated a bank in nearby Lee.

In 1821 he was elected as a state representative as a Whig, and in 1823 and 1824 he won election to the state senate.  In 1826 he was again elected as a state representative, although he was defeated in the same year in a bid for a seat in the United States Congress.  In 1830 he won election to the Massachusetts Governor's Council, and in 1835 he began a seven-year stint as Lieutenant Governor of Massachusetts, serving under Governors Edward Everett, Marcus Morton, and John Davis.  In his later years, he became a Republican.

For the last ten years of his life, he was afflicted with progressive blindness.  His business suffered, due in part to his political activities and the economic effects of the American Civil War, and he was forced into bankruptcy in 1862.

He married Sarah Allen of Wethersfield, Connecticut; the couple had seven children.

References

Lieutenant Governors of Massachusetts
Massachusetts Whigs
19th-century American politicians
1788 births
1868 deaths